Mahdi Javid (born 3 May 1987) is an Iranian professional futsal player. He is currently a member of Mes Sungun in the Iranian Futsal Super League. He was named the best player of the Asian Clubs Cup in 2018 by the AFC Futsal Club Championship. He has been selected as the best scorer of the Iranian Futsal Super League in the years 2016, 2017, 2018, 2019.

Honours

Country 
FIFA Futsal World Cup
 Third place (1): 2016
 AFC Futsal Championship
 Champion (3): 2012, 2016, 2018
 Third place (1): 2012
 Asian Indoor and Martial Arts Games
 Champion (4): 2007, 2009, 2013, 2017
 
 Grand Prix
 Runners-up (2): 2011, 2015
 WAFF Futsal Championship
 Champion (2): 2007, 2012

Club 
 AFC Futsal Club Championship
 Runners-up (2): 2013 (Giti Pasand), 2019 (Mes Sungun)
 Third Place (1): 2018 (Bank of Beirut)
 Iranian Futsal Super League
 Champion (2): 2016–17 (Giti Pasand), 2019–20 (Mes Sungun)
 Runners-up (4): 2013–14 (Giti Pasand) - 2014–15 (Giti Pasand) - 2017–18 (Tasisat Daryaei) - 2018–19 (Giti Pasand)
 Lebanon Futsal League
 Runners-up (1): 2015–16 (Bank of Beirut)

Individual 
 Best player:
 Iranian Futsal Super League Player of the Year (2): 2013–14 (Giti Pasand) - 2017–18  (Tasisat Daryaei)
 AFC Futsal Club Championship Most Valuable Player (1): 2018
 Top Goalscorer:
 Asian Indoor Games top scorer (2): 2009 (11 Goals) - 2017 (15 Goals)
 Iranian Futsal Super League top scorer (4): 2016–17 (Giti Pasand) (36 Goals) - 2017–18 (Tasisat Daryaei) (35 Goals) - 2018–19 (Giti Pasand) (36 Goals) - 2019–20 (Mes Sungun) (34 Goals)
 AFC Futsal Club Championship top scorer (1): 2018 (12) (Bank of Beirut)

References

External links
 
Mahdi Javid on Instagram
 

1987 births
Living people
People from Mashhad
Sportspeople from Mashhad
Iranian men's futsal players
Futsal forwards
Elmo Adab FSC players
Foolad Mahan FSC players
Shahid Mansouri FSC players
Giti Pasand FSC players
Tasisat Daryaei FSC players
Mes Sungun FSC players
Iranian expatriate futsal players
Iranian expatriate sportspeople in Lebanon